L'Arteosa is one of 24 parishes (administrative divisions) in Piloña, a municipality within the province and autonomous community of Asturias, in northern Spain.

The population is 101 (INE 2011).

Villages and hamlets
 Caperea
 Óbana
 El Piñuecu
 Samartín
 Les Felgueroses
 Vegarrionda

Other small locations are: L'Acebal, El Casar, Socastru and La Vega.

References

Parishes in Piloña